Rheinorange (Rhine Orange) is a sculpture erected in 1992 in Duisburg-Neuenkamp, Germany. It is located at the point where the  Ruhr flows into the Rhine at 'Rheinkilometer 780', i.e. 780 km from the source of the Rhine. It was constructed from steel by the sculptor Lutz Fritsch from Köln.

It is 25 m tall, 7 m wide and 1 m thick, and weighs 83 tonnes. The cost was over 400.000 DM, which was donated by the  Niederrhein IHK (chamber of commerce) after a fund-raising initiative by the young entrepreneurs members.  The name Rheinorange is actually a play on words. It sounds like Reinorange (pure orange) which is RAL 2004 in the  RAL color standard.

The sculpture is intended to form a landmark. The mouth of the river, the largest inland harbour in Europe, the most important steel district in Europe, a base for technology with a future, the Lehmbruck-Museum as an important gallery for modern sculpture in Europe, are all intended to be connected with each other in representing  aspects of the  economic and cultural life of  Duisburg.

The Rhine Orange is a feature on the Ruhr Industrial Heritage Trail.

Gallery

External links 
This is a translation of a German article on Wikipedia

References

Culture in Duisburg
Rhine
Outdoor sculptures in Germany
Buildings and structures in North Rhine-Westphalia